Skinemax HD is a Canadian English language specialty channel that broadcasts pornographic films in high definition. It is owned by Fifth Dimension Properties Inc, a company wholly owned by Stuart Duncan, majority owner of Ten Broadcasting.

History
In October 2012, Fifth Dimension Properties Inc. was granted approval by the Canadian Radio-television and Telecommunications Commission (CRTC) to launch "Skinemax TV", a channel described as "a national, English-language specialty Category B service devoted to adult entertainment. The service will feature programming reflecting the latest trends in themes and styles of adult programming."

The channel launched in late June 2013 on Shaw Direct, marking the first Canadian pornographic television channel to launch in HD.

On March 15, 2019, the CRTC approved Fifth Dimension Properties' request to convert Skinemax TV from a licensed Category B specialty service to an exempted Cat. B service.

References

External links
  (Note: adult content)

Canadian pornographic television channels
Television channels and stations established in 2013
Digital cable television networks in Canada
English-language television stations in Canada
2013 establishments in Ontario
HD-only channels